Simona Halep won her first Italian Open title, after the defending champion Karolína Plíšková retired from the final, with the scoreline at 6–0, 2–1.

Sofia Kenin became the first top five player and reigning Grand Slam champion to be defeated by a 'double bagel' (6–0, 6–0) scoreline since Lindsay Davenport defeated Maria Sharapova at the 2005 Indian Wells tournament. Kenin was defeated by Victoria Azarenka in the second round.

Seeds
The top eight seeds received a bye into the second round.

Draw

Finals

Top half

Section 1

Section 2

Bottom half

Section 3

Section 4

Qualifying

Seeds

Qualifiers

Qualifying draw

First qualifier

Second qualifier

Third qualifier

Fourth qualifier

Fifth qualifier

Sixth qualifier

Seventh qualifier

Eighth qualifier

References

External links
 Main draw
 Qualifying draw

Women's Singles